Big Boss Man is an album by blues musician Jimmy Reed released by the BluesWay label in 1968.

Reception

AllMusic reviewer Cub Koda stated: "Reed was in pretty sad shape by this time in his life and the monotonous approach to these songs (tunes constantly fade in and out as if only this much of the performance was salvageable) gives these recordings a real assembly line quality that's most unsettling".

Track listing
All compositions credited to Al Smith except where noted
 "Give Up and Let Me Go" – 2:48
 "I'm Leavin'" (Mary Lee Reed) – 2:40
 "Shame, Shame, Shame" (Jimmy Reed) – 2:41
 "Run Here to Me Baby" (Mary Lee Reed) – 2:45
 "Life Is Funny" – 2:40
 "Two in One Blue" (Al Smith, James Oden) – 2:42
 "My Baby Told Me"  (Mary Lee Reed) – 2:40
 "Five Years of Good Lovin'" – 2:50
 "When Two People in Love" – 2:40
 "I've Got to Keep on Rollin'" – 2:20
 "When I Woke Up This Morning" – 2:25

Personnel
Jimmy Reed – guitar, vocals, harmonica
Wayne Bennett – lead guitar
William "Lefty" Bates – rhythm guitar
Eddie Taylor, Phil Upchurch – bass
Jimmy Tillman – drums

References

Jimmy Reed albums
1968 albums
BluesWay Records albums